Mary Jane Logan (née Mitchell; 26 November 1912 – 26 March 2007) was a New Zealand athlete.

She also at one time held the New Zealand women's long jump record, and was a competent high jumper, winning the Auckland championship in 1936.

Mitchell was also known for her kauri carving, as an artist, a poet and a horsewoman. She died in Dargaville in 2007.

References

1912 births
2007 deaths
People from Dargaville
New Zealand female javelin throwers
New Zealand female long jumpers
New Zealand female high jumpers
Commonwealth Games competitors for New Zealand
Athletes (track and field) at the 1938 British Empire Games
New Zealand carvers